The 1984 FIBA Intercontinental Cup William Jones was the 18th edition of the FIBA Intercontinental Cup for men's basketball clubs and the 17th edition of the tournament in the form of a true intercontinental cup. It took place at Ginásio do Ibirapuera, São Paulo. From the FIBA European Champions Cup (EuroLeague) participated Banco Roma and FC Barcelona, from the South American Club Championship, participated Sírio and Obras Sanitarias, and from the NABL, participated the Lexington Marathon Oil.

Participants

League stage 
Day 1, September 19 1984

|}

Day 2, September 20 1984

|}

Day 3, September 21 1984

|}

Day 4, September 22 1984

|}

Day 5, September 23 1984

|}

Final standings

External links
1984 Intercontinental Basketball Cup

1984
International sports competitions in São Paulo
International basketball competitions hosted by Brazil
1984–85 in European basketball
1984–85 in South American basketball
1984–85 in American basketball
1984 in Brazilian sport